Svenskfinland (literally "Swedish Finland") is the common name for the areas in Finland where the majority of the Swedish-speaking population of Finland live. The Finland-Swedish information and cultural centre Luckan upholds a website featuring information about Finland's Swedish speaking minority in English; Svenskfinland.fi

There are four traditional areas of Svenskfinland (Finnish names are given within brackets):
 Nyland (Uusimaa), northern coast of the Gulf of Finland, from Hangö (Hanko) to Pyttis (Pyhtää), including the capital Helsingfors (Helsinki);
 Åboland, Åbo (Turku) and archipelago to the southwest from Åbo;
 Svenska Österbotten (Pohjanmaa), eastern coast of the Gulf of Bothnia from Sideby (Siipyy) to Karleby (Kokkola);
 Åland (Ahvenanmaa)
The area known as Svenskfinland is also known jokingly as Ankdammen (lit. "duck-pond").

See also
Swedish population of Finland
Finland Swedish

References

Swedish-speaking population of Finland
Swedish language
Geography of Finland
Finnish culture
Regions of Finland